Enhance Herts is the name of a charity (originally called the East and North Hertfordshire NHS Trust Charitable Fund) which was founded to provide the extras that make all the difference such as additional equipment, better facilities and new research and education for hospitals in east and north Hertfordshire. The charity supports the Lister, New QEII Hospital and Hertford County hospitals, as well as the Mount Vernon Cancer Centre.

Each year the charity seeks to raise between £1 million and £2 million, and is currently aiming to complete the CTRT Appeal to build a new chemotherapy research unit at the Mount Vernon Cancer Centre in Northwood. It is also promoting its Building Blocks appeal for children, teens and babies services, particularly with the support of the Comet newspaper, which has adopted the appeal as its charity of 2008. Several other businesses in north Hertfordshire have gone on to adopt the Building Blocks appeal, including Garden Square Shopping Centre, Letchworth, and Stevenage Town Centre.

The charity hosts a Facebook group, which can be found by searching under its name. There are also groups for Building Blocks and the CTRT Appeal.

The charity is registered at Lister Hospital, Coreys Mill Lane, Stevenage SG1 4AB, and its Registered Charity Number is 1053338.

External links
 Official website
 The Comet newspaper
Stevenage Town Centre, supporters of the Building Blocks appeal 
 Charity commission reference
"Guardian columnist Dina Rabinovitch dies" – Tribute to Dina Rabinovitch, voluntary fundraiser for the CTRT Appeal reported in The Guardian
Enhance herts is a member of the Remember a Charity consortium, seeking to increase the number of charitable legacies in wills

Organisations based in Hertfordshire